Malikyar is a village in Pishin, Pakistan, located 14 km north of Pishin.

Populated places in Pishin District